MP7 or MP 7 may refer to:
Heckler & Koch MP7, a German submachine gun.
A Mammal Paleogene zone during the Oligocene geological period
MPEG-7, a video encoding standard
Mario Party 7, a 2005 video game and the fourth and final Mario Party game for the Nintendo GameCube